The 2020 Betfred World Matchplay was the 27th annual staging of the World Matchplay, organised by the Professional Darts Corporation. The tournament took place, behind closed doors, at the Marshall Arena, Milton Keynes, from 18 to 26 July 2020.

Rob Cross was the defending champion, having won his first World Matchplay title with an 18–13 win over Michael Smith in the 2019 final. However, he was beaten 10–8 by Gabriel Clemens in the first round.

Dimitri Van den Bergh became the first unseeded player since James Wade in 2006 to reach the World Matchplay final; like Wade, Van den Bergh was making his debut in the competition. He went on to win his first major title, beating Gary Anderson 18–10 in the final. Van den Bergh was the first debutant to win the World Matchplay, excluding Larry Butler's win in the inaugural tournament.	
	
The tournament was moved from its planned venue of Winter Gardens, Blackpool, due to the disruption caused by the COVID-19 pandemic. This is the first time the tournament has not been held in Blackpool.

Prize money
The prize fund remained at £700,000, with the winner's earnings being £150,000.

Format
All games have to be won by two clear legs, with a game being extended if necessary for a maximum of six extra legs before a tie-break leg is required. For example, in a first to 10 legs first round match, if the score reaches 12-12 then the 25th leg will be the decider. The first round is played first to 10 legs, second round first to 11 legs, quarter finals first to 16 legs, semi final first to 17 legs and final first to 18 legs.

Qualification
Under the published rules, the top 16 players on the PDC Order of Merit as of 12 July 2020 were seeded for the tournament. The top 16 players on the ProTour Order of Merit, not to have already qualified on the cut-off date were unseeded.

The following players have qualified for the tournament:

PDC Order of Merit
  Michael van Gerwen (second round)
  Peter Wright (second round)
  Gerwyn Price (first round)
  Rob Cross (first round)
  Michael Smith (semi-finals)
  Nathan Aspinall (first round)
  Daryl Gurney (second round)
  Gary Anderson (runner-up)
  James Wade (second round)
  Dave Chisnall (first round)
  Ian White (first round)
  Mensur Suljović (second round)
  Krzysztof Ratajski (quarter-finals)
  Adrian Lewis (quarter-finals)
  Glen Durrant (semi-finals)
  Simon Whitlock (quarter-finals)

PDC ProTour qualifiers
  Joe Cullen (second round)
  Brendan Dolan (first round)
  José de Sousa (first round)
  Danny Noppert (second round)
  Jermaine Wattimena (first round)
  Gabriel Clemens (second round)
  Jonny Clayton (first round)
  Jamie Hughes (first round)
  Jeffrey de Zwaan (first round)
  Ryan Joyce (first round)
  Dimitri Van den Bergh (champion)
  Justin Pipe (first round)
  Vincent van der Voort (quarter-finals)
  Keegan Brown (first round)
  Steve Beaton (first round)
  Ricky Evans (first round)

Draw

References

World Matchplay (darts)
World Matchplay
World Matchplay
World Matchplay
Sport in Milton Keynes